State Route 81 (SR 81) is a  diagonal state highway that travels southwest-to-northeast in the northwestern part of the U.S. state of Georgia. Its path exists within portions of Henry, Newton, Walton, and Barrow counties. It connects the McDonough area with Winder, via Covington and Loganville.

Route description

Western terminus to Oxford

SR 81 begins at an intersection with US 19/US 41/SR 3 (Bear Creek Boulevard), just north of Hampton, in Henry County. It heads east to McDonough. There, it intersects SR 20 (Hampton Road). They run concurrent to the northeast, into the main part of town. Immediately, they have an interchange with Interstate 75 (I-75) at exit 218. The exit was rebuilt into a diverging diamond interchange, with construction being completed in June of 2022. Continuing east, the two highways intersect US 23/SR 42 in the downtown McDonough Square.

From the downtown square to an intersection with SR 155 (Zack Hinton Parkway) the highways form an east-west one-way pair. At this intersection, SR 20 splits off to the north. SR 81 then heads to the southeast before curving to the northeast and crosses over the South River, into Newton County. The bridge over the South River was replaced by Georgia DOT, with traffic reopening in December 2021.

In Henry County, SR 81 is signed as a west–east route; signage changes to south–north at or near the Newton County line. The highway has an intersection with SR 212. Then, it heads north before curving to the northeast again. It meets SR 162 just before it enters Porterdale. The intersection with SR 162 is under construction to install a new roundabout; completion is expected in May 2020, with traffic opening in January 2020. In town is an intersection with the northern terminus of SR 162 Connector. SR 81 crosses over the Yellow River and passes through the main part of town. Immediately after leaving Porterdale, it enters Covington, where it turns north and intersects US 278/SR 12, before passing under, but not interchanging I-20. Then, it passes through Oxford.

Oxford to Winder

On the northern end of Oxford, the road curves to the north-northeast and meet the northern terminus of SR 142, before turning to the north and entering Walton County. Northward is Walnut Grove, where it intersects SR 138, after which the route heads north-northwest to Loganville. In town is a brief concurrency with US 78/SR 10 (Atlanta Highway) and splits off to the northwest. In the main part of town is a very brief concurrency with SR 20. Then, it heads northeast, passing through rural areas of the county, before it crosses the Apalachee River into Barrow County.

Southwest of Winder is an intersection with US 29/SR 316. As of fall 2019, the intersection is under construction to be converted into a grade-separated interchange. Construction is estimated to be completed in October 2020. Just before entering Winder, the highway passes Fort Yargo State Park on its western end. In Winder, it reaches its northern terminus, an intersection with US 29 Business/SR 8/SR 11/SR 53.

National Highway System
The following portions of SR 81 are part of the National Highway System, a system of routes determined to be the most important for the nation's economy, mobility, and defense:
From SR 155 in McDonough to the intersection with the southern terminus of Crowell Road and the western terminus of Covington Bypass in Porterdale
The entire length of the concurrency with US 78/SR 10 in Loganville

Major intersections

See also

References

External links

 
 Georgia Roads (Routes 81 - 100)

081
Transportation in Henry County, Georgia
Transportation in Newton County, Georgia
Transportation in Walton County, Georgia
Transportation in Barrow County, Georgia